Green blood may refer to:
 Green Blood (manga), a Japanese manga series by Masasumi Kakizaki
 Hemocyanin, a copper-based system of transporting oxygen in blood found in many molluscs and arthropods  
 Sulfhemoglobinemia, a rare condition in humans caused by excess sulfhemoglobin in the blood
 Prasinohaema (Greek: "green blood"), a genus of skinks whose blood color is caused by an excess of the bile pigment biliverdin
 Prasinohaema virens, also known as the green-blooded skink, native to New Guinea

See also
 Red blood (disambiguation)